Qatil Aur Aashiq is a 1986 Bollywood action film directed by Swaroop Kumar starring Javed Khan as the hero and Shoma Anand as heroine.

Cast
 Javed Khan
 Shoma Anand
 Vijayendra Ghatge
 Zarina Wahab
 Kalpana Iyer
 Raza Murad
Om Shivpuri

Music
Lyrics: Anjaan

"Garma Garam Meri Jawani" - Alka Yagnik, Vinay Mandke
"Moti Moti Rotiya Pakana Tu Dhobaniya" - Kishore Kumar, Anuradha Paudwal
"Pyar Hota Hai Kya" - Asha Bhosle, Suresh Wadkar
"Sawan Ke Mausam Mein Dil" - Suresh Wadkar, Anuradha Paudwal
"Teri Meri Preet" - Asha Bhosle, Shabbir Kumar

References

External links

1986 films
Films scored by Nadeem–Shravan
1980s Hindi-language films
Indian action films